Clinton Community Schools are a group of community schools located in Clinton, Lenawee County, Michigan, United States. The school system has approximately 1,200 students across three buildings.

School Board
As of December 2017, the school board members include:

President - Kelly Schmidt
Vice President - Shirley Harris
Secretary - Kevin Ward 
Treasurer - Steve Clegg 
Trustee - Chad Erickson 
Trustee - Dale Wingerd 
Trustee - Monica VanTuyle

References

External links
Clinton Community Schools

School districts in Michigan
Education in Lenawee County, Michigan